Yvonne de Montfort Boyer Sugden (born 14 October 1939) is a British former figure skater who competed in ladies' singles. She is a three-time European medalist (bronze in 1954, silver in 1955 and 1956) and a three-time British national champion (1954–56). She placed fourth at the 1956 Winter Olympics.

Results

References

1939 births
British female single skaters
English female single skaters
Olympic figure skaters of Great Britain
Figure skaters at the 1956 Winter Olympics
Living people
European Figure Skating Championships medalists
People from Amersham